These are the Kowloon West results of the 2004 Hong Kong legislative election. The election was held on 12 September 2004 and all 4 seats in Kowloon West where consisted of Yau Tsim Mong District, Sham Shui Po District and Kowloon City District were contested. All four incumbents were re-elected, with Democratic Party's Lau Chin-shek ran as independent.

Overall results
Before election:

Change in composition:

Candidates list

See also
Legislative Council of Hong Kong
Hong Kong legislative elections
2004 Hong Kong legislative election

References

2004 Hong Kong legislative election